Seat belt syndrome is a collective term that includes all injury profiles associated with the use of seat belts. It is defined classically as a seat belt sign (seat belt marks on the body) plus an intra-abdominal organ injury (e.g. bowel perforations) and/or thoraco-lumbar vertebral fractures. The seat-belt sign was originally described by Garrett and Braunstein in 1962 as linear ecchymosis of the abdominal wall following a motor vehicle accident. It is indicative of an internal injury in as many as 30% of cases seen in the emergency department. Disruption of the abdominal wall musculature can also occur but is relatively uncommon.

Apart from the medical aspects of injury, there are some legal issues associated with seat belt injuries. If your seat belt fails and this can be proved, then you may be entitled to compensation. On the other hand, it may be argued that you did not wear your seat belt as it was intended or designed.

Symptoms
The symptoms associated with this syndrome depend on the injured organ. In the case of hollow organs injuries, peritoneal signs may appear. While in the case of parenchymal or vascular injuries, hypovolemic signs dominate the clinical picture.

Pathogenesis
Seat belt syndrome is caused by hyperflexion of the spine around the lap strap in sudden deceleration leading to crushing of intra-abdominal contents between the spine and the seatbelt. Fixed portions of the bowel such as proximal jejunum and distal ileum are more susceptible to injury than mobile portions since mobile segments can escape the high pressure and resultant damage.

References

Seat belts
Traffic collisions